Tassajara, a variation of the Spanish word "tasajera" (Spanish for "place where the meat is hung" or "meat drier"), is an unincorporated community in Contra Costa County, California, United States. Together with Blackhawk it forms the Blackhawk-Camino Tassajara census designated place (CDP).

History
Until 1959, it was known as Tassajero;.

A post office operated at Tassajara from 1896 to 1922. 

In California’s Hispanic era, cattle grazing was the main occupation and hides and tallow were major trade products. After roundups and slaughters, most meat was left for the wild animals, but some of the meat was preserved in the tasajera.

Tassajara Creek begins in the foothills of Mount Diablo and drains south. It is part of the huge Alameda Creek watershed, which covers 405,000 acres in two counties. The portion of this watershed in Contra Costa County is called the Upper Alameda Creek Watershed and encompasses 40,000 acres.

After the Gold Rush, settlers moved into the Tassajara Valley with their families and raised a variety of crops including hay, grains, orchards of fruit and nuts, vineyards and tomatoes. Nina McPherson Williams loved growing up in the valley and wrote: “In the land of sunshine in the county of Contra Costa, along an oak-rimmed stream, lies the Valley of Tassajara. Rich fields of native grasses gave the valley much fame from olden times to the present.”
Immigrants from many areas settled in the valley—Portuguese, Danes, Welsh and Scots. The Tassajara Grammar School provided a place for these settlers to educate their children, share parties and create new communities. Student names in the school registers reflected their family origins: Williams, McPherson, Finley, Bettencourt, Lawrence (Portuguese), Rasmussen and Hansen. The second school house, built in 1889, has been restored, at 1650 Finley Road.

Vivian Coats Edmonston, who was born in the Tassajara Valley in 1901, recalled the days when the threshing machine came to their ranch. Her mother and grandmother cooked all day, feeding crews of five or six men who worked from dawn to sunset and ate three big meals, plus two smaller meals in between.

According to Nina Williams, “Tassajara was even better known for its purebred horses than for its cattle. The Clydesdale and Norman horses raised in large numbers by John and Thomas Johnston had a wide and ready market. The J.J. brand on a draft horse was its guarantee.” She also noted that the first oil lease on Tassajara land was given by Edward Williams in 1899.

Pleasanton and Danville are about the same distance for Tassajara residents, depending on where they live. When Tassajara had a post office, from 1896 to 1921, the mail came from Pleasanton by rural carrier. Parts of the valley continue to have Pleasanton addresses, even though they are in Contra Costa County.

No matter what its original meaning, the name is now part of our California landscape. The valley’s volunteers served as firefighters for a Tassajara Fire District from 1969 to 1990. And today a new school, Tassajara Hills, is located at the edge of this beautiful valley, which is filled with reminders of our rural past.

Sources: 
This article first appeared as a column called Presenting the Past in the Danville Weekly.

References

Unincorporated communities in California
Unincorporated communities in Contra Costa County, California